On Explaining Language Change is a 1980 book by Roger Lass in which the author examines various aspects of language change.

Reception
The book was reviewed by Suzanne Romaine, Esa Itkonen and Geoffrey Sampson.

References

External links
On Explaining Language Change
1980 non-fiction books
Cambridge University Press books
Historical linguistics books
Sociolinguistics works
Books about philosophy of linguistics